Rejaur Rahman Raja (born 1 January 1999) is a Bangladeshi cricketer. He made his List A debut for Prime Doleshwar Sporting Club in the 2018–19 Dhaka Premier Division Cricket League on 21 April 2019. He made his first-class debut on 10 October 2019, for Sylhet Division in the 2019–20 National Cricket League. He made his Twenty20 debut on 28 November 2020, for Minister Group Rajshahi in the 2020–21 Bangabandhu T20 Cup. He was selected by the Chattogram Challengers for the 2022 Bangladesh Premier League.

In February 2021, he was selected in the Bangladesh Emerging squad for their home series against the Ireland Wolves. In November 2021, he was named in Bangladesh's Test squad for their series against Pakistan. In April 2022, he was again named in Bangladesh's Test squad, this time for their series against Sri Lanka. The following month, he was also named in Bangladesh's Test squad, for their series against the West Indies.

In March 2023, he named as Twenty20 International (T20I) squad for their series against England.

References

External links
 

1999 births
Living people
Bangladeshi cricketers
Prime Doleshwar Sporting Club cricketers
Sylhet Division cricketers
Place of birth missing (living people)